The National Commission on Police Reform (Spanish Comisión Nacional para la Reforma Policial, CONAREPOL) was a 2006 Venezuelan national commission which, in consultation with police and local communities, examined law enforcement in Venezuela and proposed reforms. The Commission was made up of ministerial officials, state governors, National Assembly representatives, academics, researchers and civil society representatives.

It consulted with all national sectors, including business and community leaders, commissioned studies and consulted international experts on police and police reform. "The Commission undertook extensive consultations with the police (through workshops, questionnaires, and interviews) and the community (meetings, suggestion boxes) and gathered an unprecedented amount of data from state and municipal police agencies, while also conducting a national victim survey."

CONAREPOL's findings presented a shocking but, to Venezuelans, familiar picture of widespread police corruption, extrajudicial killings, lack of equipment and training, and, a lack of basic elements of good police practice such as an operational manual for police procedures. CONAREPOL reported in January 2007, with proposals for reforms. The Commission recommended a new model of policing, with a greater emphasis on crime prevention and cooperation with local communities, and that the police should be specifically trained in human rights.

The Commission recommended the creation of a new national police force with high professional standards in order to implement the new model. This led to the setting up of the Bolivarian National Police in 2008 and the Experimental Security University in 2009 to provide the recommended training. In the first six months of operations, rates of murder and robbery fell around 60% in the pilot areas the National Police was active in.

Background
In 1958 Venezuela overthrew the dictator Marcos Pérez Jiménez, but for much of the 1958-1998 period the criminal justice and law enforcement system established under Jiménez and the earlier dictator Juan Vicente Gómez was not substantially reformed, and "the criminal justice system remained a blemish on this image of democracy". A small 1987 survey found that 74% of prisoners said that the police tortured them. The police relied heavily on obtaining confession evidence, and for poor defendants a lack of effective defence lawyers "led to frequent convictions of innocent people".

Other aspects of the justice system conspired to make this worse: "Venezuelan criminal procedure crushed poor and uneducated defendants in its Kafkaesque gears." Prisons were extremely violent, with a high probability of death or rape; and about 70% of prisoners were awaiting a judge's decision. After some years of public pressure, 1998 saw the drafting of a radically reformed criminal law, which came into effect in July 1999.

According to one academic, these changes, which substantially reduced police powers of detention (although pressure from police chiefs and politicians later widened them somewhat), may have led to an increase in police violence. The police's tradition of a punitive style of policing is reflected in a high rate of death from "resisting authority" - a concept which "is very vague and appears to be used to cover a multitude of incidents in which the police either kidnap and murder civilians, or shoot them in the encounter without any justification."

There were nearly 10,000 such cases between 2000 and 2005, and around two-thirds of these are classifiable as police murders, according to the Public Prosecutor. These "resisting authority" deaths increased dramatically after the 1999 criminal law revision (by over 50% in 2000). The 1355 civilians killed in this way in 2005 amounted to a death rate of 5 per 100,000 inhabitants - higher than many countries' total homicide rate that year.

Venezuela in 2006 had around 116,000 police officers amounting to a very high rate of around 426 per 100,000 inhabitants. Law enforcement in Venezuela has however long been highly fragmented, with a number of national agencies, two dozen state agencies, and (since 1989) around 100 municipal forces. As a result, legislative projects for the creation of a national police agency had appeared in 1974, 1976, 1987, 1990, 2001, and 2004.

In addition, the police were widely seen as often corrupt and involved in crimes, and crime rates had been rising since the 1980s. Trust in most police is generally low (particularly in Caracas, with some exceptions for municipal police of wealthier municipalities in Caracas), and only around a third of violent crimes are reported to the police, with half of survey respondents citing a lack of belief that the police would do anything.

Activities
In 2006 the then Minister of the Interior and Justice, Jesse Chacón, announced the National Commission on Police Reform (CONAREPOL) would examine policing in depth and propose reforms. The Commission was made up of ministerial officials, state governors, National Assembly representatives, academics, researchers and civil society representatives. It consulted with all national sectors, including business and community leaders, commissioned studies and consulted international experts on police and police reform.

"The Commission undertook extensive consultations with the police (through workshops, questionnaires, and interviews) and the community (meetings, suggestion boxes) and gathered an unprecedented amount of data from state and municipal police agencies, while also conducting a national victim survey." Around 75,000 people participated in the community consultations.

Findings
CONAREPOL reported various findings of the state of law enforcement in Venezuela. One of the findings was that the third largest category of crimes was bribes demanded by public officials - with the overwhelming majority of demands coming from police or National Guard (which also has a policing role). Besides that, CONAREPOL "found that entry requirements vary quite markedly among agencies. For example, only 17% demand a particular level of education, and only 16% require a certain level of physical proficiency, while only about 30% require applicants to show that they do not have a criminal record".

In general, the Commission found, "bureaucracy is weakly developed: three-quarters of state and municipal forces do not have a manual for procedures and two-thirds lack an organizational manual".

On infrastructure and equipment, the Commission found that
"Careful study of the different police agencies makes it evident that many do not have adequate infrastructure, and they are lacking in basic services or the spaces that are necessary for police activities (e.g., holding cells). In other cases, they do not even have their own building. Higher level technological resources (phones, fax, internet connection, computers, software) are relatively rare or, if present, are found only at central headquarters. Lack of, or deficiencies in, infrastructure are most marked for the municipal police.… [T]he majority of [all] police agencies are unable to assign a firearm to each officer on duty; neither are there sufficient handcuffs or bullet-proof vests. Some agencies have only one firearm for the whole force."

CONAREPOL reported in January 2007, with proposals for police reforms. The Commission recommended a new model of policing, with a greater emphasis on crime prevention and cooperation with local communities, and that the police should be specifically trained in human rights. The Commission recommended the creation of a new national police force with high professional standards in order to implement the new model. The Commission also recommended greater democratic accountability of the police to the community, with civilian supervision, and a system of internal supervision within the police force.

Outcomes
After the CONAREPOL report, the Commission's proposals stayed in limbo for some time owing to political conflicts within the government. In April 2008 President Hugo Chavez issued a decree creating the Bolivarian National Police, as well as "new arrangements for the recruitment, training, coordination and operations of most of the country's public order police agencies". The decree foresaw the eventual merger into the new National Police of at least three of the existing national police agencies. It also provided for the creation of new communal police forces which would work together with Venezuelan Communal Councils.

In November 2008 a Commission for the Police System (Comsipol) was created to implement CONAREPOL's recommendations. The Experimental Security University was set up in 2009 to provide the recommended training. In the first six months of operations, rates of murder and robbery fell around 60% in the areas the National Police was active. According to one source, "Residents living around the [pilot areas] put it simply, "we shoot at them less"."

See also 
 Law enforcement in Venezuela

References

Law enforcement in Venezuela